What Doth Life is a record label founded in 2010 and based in Windsor, Vermont. Notable artists include The Pilgrims, Carton, Giant Travel Avant Garde, Luke Chrisinger, and Derek and the Demons. The label is run by the musicians it represents and is described as a "musician's co-op".

References

American independent record labels